Tiger Division may refer to:

 88th Division (National Revolutionary Army), China (1932–1948)
 373rd (Croatian) Infantry Division (Wehrmacht) (1943–1945)
 Capital Mechanized Infantry Division, Republic of Korea (formed 1948)
 19th Division (Imperial Japanese Army) (1915–1945)
 10th Armored Division (United States) (1942–1945)

See also
 31st Indian Armoured Division, White Tiger Division (1940–1945)